Şevket Pamuk is chair of contemporary Turkish studies at the European Institute, London School of Economics and Political Science, and Professor of Economics and Economic History at Boğaziçi (Bosphorus) University.

He is a leading economic historian of the Ottoman Empire, the Middle East and modern Turkey. He is also the author of The Ottoman Empire and European Capitalism 1820–1913: Trade, Investment and Production (Cambridge University Press, 1987) and A Monetary History of the Ottoman Empire (Cambridge University Press, 2000). He co-authored A History of Middle East Economies in the Twentieth Century (1999) with Harvard-based historian Roger Owen. A collection of his articles on the Ottoman economy recently appeared as Ottoman Economy and Its Institutions  (Ashgate-Variorum, 2008). His research interests include Turkish economic history since 1800, the Ottoman economy in the early modern era, and economic growth in the Balkans and the Middle East since 1800. His last book published in Turkish in 2014 examines Turkey's record of economic growth and institutional change during the last two centuries. He continues to work on the economic history of Ottoman Empire, modern Turkey, the Middle East and Europe.

Pamuk was born in Istanbul. After attending high school at Robert College, in Istanbul, Pamuk graduated from Yale University (1972) and obtained his PhD degree in economics from the University of California, Berkeley (1978). He has since taught at various universities in Turkey and the United States, including Ankara, Pennsylvania, Villanova, Princeton, Michigan at Ann Arbor, Northwestern and beginning in 1994 at Bogaziçi (Bosphorus) University, Istanbul, as Professor of Economics and Economic History. Pamuk was professor and chair of contemporary Turkish studies at the European Institute, London School of Economics and Political Science, during 2008–13.

Pamuk was the president of the European Historical Economics Society, an association of European economic historians, has been a member of the executive committee of the International Economic History Association, a member of the Standing Committee on the Humanities of the European Science Foundation. He is currently the president of the Asian Historical Economics Society. He is also a member of the Science Academy (Bilim Akademisi), Turkey and a member of Academia Europaea. He is an editor of the European Review of Economic History.

Şevket Pamuk is the older brother of Nobel Prize-winning novelist Orhan Pamuk, and also has a younger half-sister, Hümeyra Pamuk, who is a journalist.

References

Publications
 "Publications in English"

Turkish non-fiction writers
Turkish economists
Academic staff of Boğaziçi University
Turkish people of Circassian descent
Robert College alumni
1950 births
Living people
Date of birth missing (living people)
Place of birth missing (living people)
Academics of the London School of Economics